Thomas Thévenoud (born 5 May 1974) is a French politician. He is a member of the National Assembly of France, a former trade minister, and a former member of the French Socialist Party. He represents the first legislative district of Saône-et-Loire department since 2012, and is vice-president of the general council of the department since 2008.

References

External links

Thomas Thévenoud at National Assembly of France

1974 births
Living people
Politicians from Dijon
Government ministers of France
Socialist Party (France) politicians
Sciences Po alumni
Deputies of the 14th National Assembly of the French Fifth Republic